This is the structure of the British Armed Forces, as of October 2021.

Ministry of Defence
Ministry of Defence, at Main Building, Whitehall
Secretary of State for Defence, The Rt. Hon. Ben Wallace MP
Minister of State for Defence Procurement, Jeremy Quin MP
Minister of State for Defence, The Rt. Hon. The Baroness Goldie
Parliamentary Under-Secretary of State for the Armed Forces, James Heappey MP
Parliamentary Under-Secretary of State for Defence People and Veterans, Johnny Mercer MP
Defence Council of the United Kingdom
Defence Board
Admiralty Board
Army Board
Air Force Board
Chiefs of Staff Committee
Chief of the Defence Staff, Admiral Sir Tony Radakin
Deputy Chief of the Defence Staff (Military Strategy and Operations), Lieutenant General Douglas Chalmers
Deputy Chief of the Defence Staff (Financial and Military Capability), Air Marshal Richard Knighton
Chief of Defence People, Lieutenant General James Swift
Vice-Chief of the Defence Staff, General Gwyn Jenkins
First Sea Lord and Chief of the Naval Staff, Admiral Sir Ben Key
Chief of the General Staff, General Sir Patrick Sanders
Chief of the Air Staff, Air Chief Marshal Sir Michael Wigston
Commander Strategic Command, General Sir James Hockenhull

Defence Infrastructure Organisation
Headquarters, Defence Infrastructure Organisation, at Sutton Coldfield –to move to DMS Whittington in 2021
Ministry of Defence Guard Service
Northern Ireland Security Guard Service
Defence Fire and Rescue Service, at Marlborough Lines
Defence Training Estate, at Waterloo Lines
Headquarters, Defence Training Estate Wales & West Midlands, at Sennybridge Training Area
Headquarters, Defence Training Estate South East, at Hythe
Headquarters, Defence Training Estate South West, at Wyvern Barracks
Headquarters, Defence Training Estate North East, at Wathgill Camp
Headquarters, Defence Training Estate North West, at Warcop Training Area
Headquarters, Defence Training Estate East, at West Tofts Camp
Headquarters, Defence Training Estate Scotland, at Forthside Barracks
Headquarters, Salisbury Plain Training Area, at Westdown Camp

Defence Equipment and Support
Headquarters, Defence Equipment and Support, at MoD Abbey Wood
British Forces Post Office, at RAF Northolt
Defence Equipment Sales Authority, at MoD Bicester
Defence Standardization, at Kentigern House, Glasgow
Defence Munitions
RNAD Coulport
DM Crombie
DM Beith
DM Plymouth
DM Glen Douglas
DM Gosport
DM Kineton

Defence Science and Technology Laboratory
Headquarters, Defence Science and Technology Laboratory, at Porton Down
DSTL Fort Halstead
DSTL Portsdown West
Defence Wargaming Centre
DSTL Alverstoke
DSTL Sandridge
DSTL Langhurst

Ministry of Defence Police

Headquarters, Ministry of Defence Police, at MDP Wethersfield
Criminal Investigation Department, at MDP Wethersfield
Nuclear Guard Force
Special Escort Group, at AWE Aldermaston
Operational Support Units
Operational Support Unit North, at RAF Linton-on-Ouse
Operational Support Unit South, at MDP Wethersfield
Central Support Groups
Central Support Group Aldershot, at Aldershot Garrison
Central Support Group Bicester, at MoD Bicester
Central Support Group Scotland, at HMNB Clyde
Headquarters, Nuclear Division, at MoD Abbey Wood
Headquarters, Territorial Division, at Imphal Barracks

Defence Safety Authority
Headquarters, Defence Safety Authority, at Main Building, Whitehall
Military Aviation Authority, at MoD Abbey Wood
Military Air Accident Investigation Branch
Land Accident Prevention and Investigation Team 
Defence Nuclear Safety Regulator
Defence Maritime Regulator
Defence Ordnance, Munitions and Explosives Safety Regulator
Defence Land Systems Safety Regulator
Land Systems Safety Regulator
Defence Movement and Transport Safety Regulator
Defence Fuel and Gas Safety Regulator
Defence Fire Safety Regulator

Defence Nuclear Organisation
Headquarters, Defence Nuclear Organisation, at Main Building, Whitehall
Warhead Directorate

Defence Business Services
Headquarters, Defence Business Services, at MoD Abbey Wood
DBS Civilian HR

Defence Electronics and Components Agency
Headquarters, Defence Electronics and Components Agency, at MoD Sealand

Oil and Pipelines Agency
Headquarters, Oil and Pipelines Agency, at Petty France, Westminster
Campbeltown Oil Fuel Depot
Garelochhead Oil Fuel Depot, at HMNB Clyde
Gosport Oil Fuel Depot, at HMNB Portsmouth
Loch Ewe Oil Fuel Depot
Loch Striven Oil Fuel Depot
Thanckes Oil Fuel Depot, at HMNB Devonport
Plumley and Cape of Good Hope (oil storage)

United Kingdom Hydrographic Office
Headquarters, United Kingdom Hydrographic Office, at Taunton

Submarine Delivery Agency
Headquarters, Submarine Delivery Agency, at

Service Prosecuting Authority
Headquarters, Service Prosecuting Authority, at RAF Northolt

Non-departmental Organisations
Armed Forces Covenant Fund Trust
Single Source Regulations Office, at Finlaison House, London
Advisory Committee on Conscientious Objectors
Armed Forces' Pay Review Body
Defence Nuclear Safety Committee
Independent Medical Expert Group
Nuclear Research Advisory Council
Scientific Advisory Committee on the Medical Implications of Less-Lethal Weapons
Defence Science Expert Committee
Veterans Advisory and Pensions Committees
Advisory Group on Military Medicine
Defence and Security Media Advisory Committee
Service Complaints Ombudsman
United Kingdom Reserve Forces Association
National Army Museum, at Royal Hospital Road, Chelsea
National Museum of the Royal Navy
National Museum of the Royal Navy Hartlepool, at Jackson Dock, Hartlepool
National Museum of the Royal Navy, Portsmouth, at HMNB Portsmouth
Royal Marines Museum, at HMNB Portsmouth
Royal Navy Submarine Museum, Gosport
Fleet Air Arm Museum, at RNAS Yeovilton
Explosion! Museum of Naval Firepower, at Gosport
Royal Air Force Museum
Royal Air Force Museum London, at Hendon Aerodrome
Royal Air Force Museum Cosford, at RAF Cosford

Reserve Forces and Cadets Association
East Anglia Reserve Forces and Cadets Association
East Midlands Reserve Forces and Cadets Association
Greater London Reserve Forces and Cadets Association
Highland Reserve Forces and Cadets Association
Lowland Reserve Forces and Cadets Association
Northern Ireland Reserve Forces and Cadets Association
North of England Reserve Forces and Cadets Association
North West of England and Isle of Man Reserve Forces and Cadets Association
South East Reserve Forces and Cadets Association
South West Reserve Forces and Cadets Association
Wales Reserve Forces and Cadets Association
Wessex Reserve Forces and Cadets Association
West Midlands Reserve Forces and Cadets Association
Yorkshire and the Humber Reserve Forces and Cadets Association

Strategic Command
Headquarters, Strategic Command, at Northwood Headquarters, Eastbury
Defence Digital, at MoD Corsham
ISS Boddington
Joint Arms Control Implementation Group, at RAF Henlow
Joint Counter-Terrorism Training and Advisory Team, at Risborough Barracks
Development, Concepts and Doctrine Centre, at MoD Shrivenham

Permanent Joint Operating Bases
British Forces Cyprus
Joint Service Signal Unit (Cyprus), at Ayios Nikolaos Station
Cyprus Communications Unit, at RAF Akrotiri
Cyprus Operations Support Unit, at RAF Akrotiri
Cyprus Joint Police Unit, at Episkopi Cantonment
Joint Services Health Unit, at RAF Akrotiri
No. 84 Squadron RAF, at RAF Akrotiri, (Bell Griffin HAR2)
1st Battalion, Royal Anglian Regiment, at Dhekelia Cantonment
2nd Battalion, Yorkshire Regiment, at Episkopi Cantonment
Cyprus Military Working Dog Troop, at Episkopi Cantonment
Sovereign Base Areas Police, HQ at Episkopi Cantonment
British Forces South Atlantic Islands, at RAF Mount Pleasant
Naval Party 2010, at Mare Harbour
, at Mare Harbour
Anzio Company, 1st Battalion, Duke of Lancaster's Regiment (Roulement Infantry Company (RIC), as of March 2022)
32 (Minden) Battery, 16th Regiment, RA, (Sky Sabre) (Air defence battery), as of December 2021
Falkland Islands Joint Logistics Unit
Engineer Unit
Falkland Islands Support Unit
Joint Communications Unit Falkland Islands
Joint Services Explosive Ordnance Disposal Unit
Joint Services Provost and Security Unit
Joint Services Signals Unit
No. 905 Expeditionary Air Wing RAF
No. 1312 Flight RAF, (A400M Atlas, Voyager KC2)
No. 1435 Flight RAF, (Eurofighter Typhoon)
British Forces Gibraltar
Royal Gibraltar Regiment, at Devil's Tower Camp
Gibraltar Squadron, RN, at Port of Gibraltar
RAF Gibraltar
Joint Provost and Security Unit, at Gibdock
Gibraltar Defence Police, at Gibdock
British Forces British Indian Ocean Territories, at Diego Garcia
Naval Party 1002, at Diego Garcia

Defence Intelligence
Headquarters, Defence Intelligence, at Main Building, Whitehall, (Lieutenant General James Hockenhull)
Joint Forces Cyber Group
Joint Cyber Unit (Reserve), at Northwood Headquarters
Reserve Cyber Unit, Royal Naval Reserve
No. 600 (City of London) Squadron RAuxAF, at RAF Northolt
No. 614 (County of Glamorgan) Squadron RAuxAF, at Cardiff
Land Information Assurance Group, (British Army), at MoD Corsham
Joint Forces Intelligence Group, at RAF Wyton
Defence Intelligence Fusion Centre, at RAF Wyton
National Centre for Geospatial Intelligence, at RAF Wyton
Defence Geographic Centre, at MoD Feltham
Joint Services Signals Organisation, at RAF Digby
Defence HUMINT Unit
Joint Aeronautical and Geospatial Organisation, at RAF Wyton
No. 1 Aeronautical Information Documents Unit
Joint Intelligence Training Group, at RAF Chicksands
Defence College of Intelligence, at RAF Chicksands
Defence School of Photography, at RAF Cosford
Royal School of Military Survey, at Denison Barracks

Defence Medical Services
Headquarters, Defence Medical Services, at DMS Whittington, (Peter Homa)
Surgeon-General of the UK Armed Forces, (Major General Timothy Hodgetts)
Director of Medical Personnel and Training, (Air Vice-Marshal Clare Walton)
Royal Centre for Defence Medicine, at Queen Elizabeth Hospital Birmingham
Defence School of Healthcare Education, at Queen Elizabeth Hospital Birmingham
Defence Medical Academy, at DMS Whittington
Director Healthcare Delivery and Training (Major General Paul Cain)
Defence and National Rehabilitation Centre, at Stanford Hall
Defence Primary Healthcare
Joint Hospital Group
James Cook University Hospital, Middlesbrough
John Radcliffe Hospital, Oxford
Queen Victoria Hospital, East Grinstead
Frimley Park Hospital, Frimley
Chelsea and Westminster Hospital, Chelsea
Queen Alexandra Hospital, Portsmouth
Derriford Hospital, Plymouth

Directorate of Joint Capability
Headquarters, Joint Capability

Directorate of Joint Warfare
Headquarters, Joint Warfare
Joint Information Activities Group, at RAF Halton

Directorate of Resources and Policy
Headquarters, Resources and Policy

Directorate Defence Logistics and Support
Headquarters, Defence Logistics and Support

Directorate of Special Forces
Headquarters, United Kingdom Special Forces, at Main Building, Whitehall
Special Boat Service, at RM Poole
21 Special Air Service Regiment (Artists) (Reserve), at Regent's Park Barracks
22 Special Air Service Regiment, at Stirling Lines
23 Special Air Service Regiment (Reserve), at Birmingham
Special Reconnaissance Regiment, at Stirling Lines
Special Forces Support Group, at MOD St Athan
18 (UKSF) Signal Regiment, at Stirling Lines
Joint Special Forces Aviation Wing, at RAF Odiham
No. 7 Squadron RAF, at RAF Odiham, (Chinook HC6)
No. 658 Squadron, AAC, at Stirling Lines, (AS365 Dauphin)
Special Forces Flight, No. 47 Squadron RAF, at RAF Brize Norton

Defence Academy of the United Kingdom
Headquarters, Defence Academy of the United Kingdom, at MoD Shrivenham
Royal College of Defence Studies, at Seaford House
Joint Services Command and Staff College, at Watchfield
Armed Forces Chaplaincy Centre, at Beckett House
Defence Centre of Training Support, at RAF Halton
Defence Technical Undergraduate Scheme
Taurus Squadron, at Birmingham, (Aston, Birmingham, and Oxford Universities)
Thunderer Squadron, at Southampton, (Southampton and Portsmouth Universities, and Imperial College London)
Trojan Squadron, at Newcastle upon Tyne, (Newcastle, Northumbria, and Strathclyde Universities)
Typhoon Squadron, at Loughborough, (Loughborough, and Cambridge Universities)
Defence Engagement School, at MoD Shrivenham
Defence Centre for Languages and Culture, at MoD Shrivenham
Defence Attaché and Loan Service Centre, at MoD Shrivenham
Nuclear Department, at 
Technology School, at MoD Shrivenham
Defence Leadership Centre, at MoD Shrivenham
Business Skills College, at MoD Shrivenham
Centre of Air Safety Training

Permanent Joint Headquarters
Permanent Joint Headquarters, at Northwood Headquarters
Standing Joint Force Headquarters, at Northwood Headquarters
Standing Joint Force Logistics Component Headquarters, at Northwood Headquarters

Royal Navy

Strength: 34,040 Regular, 4,130 Maritime Reserve, 7,960 Royal Fleet Reserve; 87 Ships, 174 Aircraft
First Sea Lord and Chief of the Naval Staff, Admiral Sir Ben Key
Second Sea Lord and Deputy Chief of Naval Staff, Vice Admiral Nicholas Hine
Fleet Commander, Vice Admiral Andrew Burns
Assistant Chief of the Naval Staff (Policy), Rear Admiral Iain Lower
Finance Director (Navy), Nick Donlevy
Warrant Officer to the Royal Navy, Warrant Officer Class One Carl Steedman

British Army

Strength: 82,230 regulars, 30,040 Army Reserve
Army Headquarters, at Marlborough Lines
Chief of the General Staff, General Sir Mark Carleton-Smith
Deputy Chief of the General Staff, Lieutenant-General Sir Christopher Tickell
Commander Field Army, Lieutenant-General Ralph Wooddisse
Commander Home Command, Lieutenant-General Ian Cave
Commander Allied Rapid Reaction Corps, Lieutenant-General Sir Edward Smyth-Osbourne
Army Sergeant Major, Warrant Officer Class One Paul Carney

Royal Air Force

Strength: 33,200 Regular, 1,940 RAuxAF, 3,300 Reserve; 832 aircraft
Royal Air Force, at RAF High Wycombe
Chief of the Air Staff, Air Chief Marshal Sir Michael Wigston
Assistant Chief of the Air Staff, Air Vice Marshal Simon Edwards
Deputy Commander (Operations), Air Marshal Gerry Mayhew
Deputy Commander (Capability), Air Marshal Andrew Turner
Air Member for Materiel and Chief of Materiel, Vice Admiral Richard Thompson
Warrant Officer of the Royal Air Force, Warrant Officer Jake Alpert

References

Structure of contemporary armed forces
Military units and formations of the United Kingdom
 British Armed Forces
 Ministry of Defence (United Kingdom)